Nicholas 'Nick' Hall (born 19 September 1970) is a former badminton competitor for New Zealand.

He has won three bronze medals at the Commonwealth Games, at the 1994 Commonwealth Games he won the bronze medal in the men's singles competition. Four years later at the 1998 Commonwealth Games he won a bronze medal in the men's team event. His last bronze medal was won at the 2002 Commonwealth Games in the mixed team event.

References

1970 births
Living people
New Zealand male badminton players
Commonwealth Games bronze medallists for New Zealand
Badminton players at the 1990 Commonwealth Games
Badminton players at the 1994 Commonwealth Games
Badminton players at the 1998 Commonwealth Games
Badminton players at the 2002 Commonwealth Games
Commonwealth Games medallists in badminton
Medallists at the 1994 Commonwealth Games
Medallists at the 1998 Commonwealth Games
Medallists at the 2002 Commonwealth Games